Gifford is a town in Hampton County, South Carolina, United States. The population was 288 at the 2010 census, down from 370 at the 2000 census.

Geography
Gifford is located in northwestern Hampton County at  (32.860831, -81.238958). U.S. Route 321 (Columbia Highway) passes through the center of town, leading north  to Fairfax and south  to Luray.

Demographics

As of the census of 2000, there were 370 people, 123 households, and 87 families residing in the town. The population density was 393.0 people per square mile (152.0/km2). There were 146 housing units at an average density of 155.1 per square mile (60.0/km2). The racial makeup of the town was 6.22% White, 92.70% African American, and 1.08% from two or more races.

There were 123 households, out of which 34.1% had children under the age of 18 living with them, 35.8% were married couples living together, 30.1% had a female householder with no husband present, and 28.5% were non-families. 24.4% of all households were made up of individuals, and 6.5% had someone living alone who was 65 years of age or older. The average household size was 3.01 and the average family size was 3.67.

In the town, the population was spread out, with 36.5% under the age of 18, 10.0% from 18 to 24, 25.1% from 25 to 44, 20.0% from 45 to 64, and 8.4% who were 65 years of age or older. The median age was 27 years. For every 100 females, there were 86.9 males. For every 100 females age 18 and over, there were 75.4 males.

The median income for a household in the town was $18,375, and the median income for a family was $23,750. Males had a median income of $20,250 versus $16,364 for females. The per capita income for the town was $7,602. About 26.7% of families and 37.9% of the population were below the poverty line, including 47.8% of those under age 18 and 45.5% of those age 65 or over.

External links
Information about the town of Gifford from Hampton County

References

Towns in Hampton County, South Carolina
Towns in South Carolina